The history of artificial neural networks (ANN) began with Warren McCulloch and Walter Pitts (1943) who created a computational model for neural networks based on algorithms called threshold logic. This model paved the way for research to split into two approaches. One approach focused on biological processes while the other focused on the application of neural networks to artificial intelligence. This work led to work on nerve networks and their link to finite automata.

Hebbian learning 
In the early 1940s, D. O. Hebb created a learning hypothesis based on the mechanism of neural plasticity that became known as Hebbian learning. Hebbian learning is unsupervised learning. This evolved into models for long-term potentiation. Researchers started applying these ideas to computational models in 1948 with Turing's B-type machines. Farley and Clark (1954) first used computational machines, then called "calculators", to simulate a Hebbian network. Other neural network computational machines were created by Rochester, Holland, Habit and Duda (1956). Rosenblatt (1958) created the perceptron, an algorithm for pattern recognition. With mathematical notation, Rosenblatt described circuitry not in the basic perceptron, such as the exclusive-or circuit that could not be processed by neural networks at the time. In 1959, a biological model proposed by Nobel laureates Hubel and Wiesel was based on their discovery of two types of cells in the primary visual cortex: simple cells and complex cells. The first functional networks with many layers were published by Ivakhnenko and Lapa in 1965, as the Group Method of Data Handling.

Research stagnated after machine learning research by Minsky and Papert (1969), who discovered two key issues with the computational machines that processed neural networks. The first was that basic perceptrons were incapable of processing the exclusive-or circuit. The second was that computers didn't have enough processing power to effectively handle the work required by large neural networks. Neural network research slowed until computers achieved far greater processing power. Much of artificial intelligence had focused on high-level (symbolic) models processed by with explicit algorithms, characterized for example by expert systems with knowledge embodied in if-then rules, until in the late 1980s research expanded to low-level (sub-symbolic) machine learning, characterized by knowledge embodied in the parameters of a cognitive model.

Backpropagation 
A key trigger for renewed interest in neural networks and learning was Werbos's (1975) backpropagation algorithm that enabled practical training of multi-layer networks. Backpropagation distributed the error term back up through the layers, by modifying the weights at each node.

In the mid-1980s, parallel distributed processing became popular under the name connectionism. Rumelhart and McClelland (1986) described the use of connectionism to simulate neural processes.

Support vector machines and simpler methods such as linear classifiers gradually overtook neural networks. However, neural networks transformed domains such as the prediction of protein structures.

In 1992, max-pooling was introduced to help with least shift invariance and tolerance to deformation to aid in 3D object recognition. In 2010, Backpropagation training through max-pooling was accelerated by GPUs and shown to perform better than other pooling variants.

The vanishing gradient problem affects many-layered feedforward networks that used backpropagation and also recurrent neural networks (RNNs). As errors propagate from layer to layer, they shrink exponentially with the number of layers, impeding the tuning of neuron weights that is based on those errors, particularly affecting deep networks.

To overcome this problem, Schmidhuber adopted a multi-level hierarchy of networks (1992) pre-trained one level at a time by unsupervised learning and fine-tuned by backpropagation. Behnke (2003) relied only on the sign of the gradient (Rprop) on problems such as image reconstruction and face localization.

Hinton et al. (2006) proposed learning a high-level representation using successive layers of binary or real-valued latent variables with a restricted Boltzmann machine to model each layer. Once sufficiently many layers have been learned, the deep architecture may be used as a generative model by reproducing the data when sampling down the model (an "ancestral pass") from the top level feature activations. In 2012, Ng and Dean created a network that learned to recognize higher-level concepts, such as cats, only from watching unlabeled images taken from YouTube videos.

Earlier challenges in training deep neural networks were successfully addressed with methods such as unsupervised pre-training, while available computing power increased through the use of GPUs and distributed computing. Neural networks were deployed on a large scale, particularly in image and visual recognition problems. This became known as "deep learning".

Hardware-based designs 
The development of metal–oxide–semiconductor (MOS) very-large-scale integration (VLSI), in the form of complementary MOS (CMOS) technology, enabled the development of practical artificial neural networks in the 1980s.

Computational devices were created in CMOS, for both biophysical simulation and neuromorphic computing. Nanodevices for very large scale principal components analyses and convolution may create a new class of neural computing because they are fundamentally analog rather than digital (even though the first implementations may use digital devices). Ciresan and colleagues (2010) in Schmidhuber's group showed that despite the vanishing gradient problem, GPUs make backpropagation feasible for many-layered feedforward neural networks.

Contests 
Between 2009 and 2012, recurrent neural networks and deep feedforward neural networks developed in Schmidhuber's research group won eight international competitions in pattern recognition and machine learning. For example, the bi-directional and multi-dimensional long short-term memory (LSTM) of Graves et al. won three competitions in connected handwriting recognition at the 2009 International Conference on Document Analysis and Recognition (ICDAR), without any prior knowledge about the three languages to be learned.

Ciresan and colleagues won pattern recognition contests, including the IJCNN 2011 Traffic Sign Recognition Competition, the ISBI 2012 Segmentation of Neuronal Structures in Electron Microscopy Stacks challenge and others. Their neural networks were the first pattern recognizers to achieve human-competitive/superhuman performance on benchmarks such as traffic sign recognition (IJCNN 2012), or the MNIST handwritten digits problem.

Researchers demonstrated (2010) that deep neural networks interfaced to a hidden Markov model with context-dependent states that define the neural network output layer can drastically reduce errors in large-vocabulary speech recognition tasks such as voice search.

GPU-based implementations of this approach won many pattern recognition contests, including the IJCNN 2011 Traffic Sign Recognition Competition, the ISBI 2012 Segmentation of neuronal structures in EM stacks challenge, the ImageNet Competition and others.

Deep, highly nonlinear neural architectures similar to the neocognitron and the "standard architecture of vision", inspired by simple and complex cells, were pre-trained with unsupervised methods by Hinton. A team from his lab won a 2012 contest sponsored by Merck to design software to help find molecules that might identify new drugs.

Convolutional neural networks 
, the state of the art in deep learning feedforward networks alternated between convolutional layers and max-pooling layers, topped by several fully or sparsely connected layers followed by a final classification layer. Learning is usually done without unsupervised pre-training. The convolutional layer includes filters that are convolved with the input. Each filter is equivalent to a weights vector that has to be trained.

Such supervised deep learning methods were the first to achieve human-competitive performance on certain practical applications.

ANNs were able to guarantee shift invariance to deal with small and large natural objects in large cluttered scenes, only when invariance extended beyond shift, to all ANN-learned concepts, such as location, type (object class label), scale, lighting and others. This was realized in Developmental Networks (DNs) whose embodiments are Where-What Networks, WWN-1 (2008) through WWN-7 (2013).

References

External links 
 

Computational statistics
 
Computational neuroscience